Fred C. Babcock/Cecil M. Webb Wildlife Management Area (WMA) is Florida's oldest wildlife management area and protects  just southeast of Punta Gorda in Charlotte and Lee Counties, Florida. The area is accessed from its own exit off of Interstate-75.

Fauna 
The landscape-level of conserved habitat at this WMA serves as important habitat for a range of species in otherwise highly-developed southwest Florida. Federally-listed species such as Red-cockaded woodpecker, Florida bonneted bat, and Eastern indigo snake occupy this WMA. On rare occasions, Florida panthers have been sighted here. Numerous rare plants have also been recorded from the area.

Recreational Activities 
Hunting is popular at Fred C. Babcock/Cecil M. Webb Wildlife Management Area. white-tailed deer and Northern bobwhite populations continue to rise due to habitat management, and opportunities also exist to hunt mourning dove and feral hog. A shooting range is located close to the entrance and sees hundreds of visitors on the weekend. Anglers mainly fish  Webb Lake but also utilize the many ponds scattered throughout the property.

Specialty birds such as Red-cockaded woodpecker and Bachman's sparrow attract birders to this Great Florida Birding and Wildlife Trail site. Two hiking trails pass by ponds and marshes while several miles of unpaved roads allow bicyclers and horseback-riders to explore the area. Camping is available at the Webb Lake Campground.

References 

Protected areas of Charlotte County, Florida
Protected areas of Lee County, Florida
Wildlife management areas of Florida
Krug, A.S. 1962. Automatic quail feeders:  a cost study.  Charlotte County Quail Investigation, Annual Report.  Federal Aid Project W‑11‑R.  Florida Game and Fresh Water Fish Commission, Tallahassee.  8pp.
Krug, A.S. 1963. Modern wildlife management. Florida Wildlife,17(7):27‑29.